Founded in 1966, the Language Freedom Movement (Irish: Gluaiseacht Saoirse Teanga) was a political organisation opposed to some aspects of the state-attempted revival of the Irish language in the Republic of Ireland, which had the backing of several notable Irish-speaking writers including Séamus Ó Grianna ("Máire") and John B. Keane.

The Movement's concerns

Examinations
At the time the Movement was formed, if a student failed the Irish paper in their Leaving Certificate they were deemed to have failed the whole exam. This requirement was abolished in 1973, although students are still obliged to study Irish as part of the Leaving Certificate programme, and a pass is required for Irish students entering almost all Irish universities (but not for foreign students). In 1974 Irish was removed as a requirement for entry to the civil service.

Textbooks
Significant changes in the Leaving Certificate maths curriculum were reflected in two new textbooks produced by the Irish Christian Brothers.  However, material for the new honours (higher-level) syllabus was offered only in a government-subsidised book in Irish, while the pass (lower-level) material was published in English.  The situation continued for several years, until affordable alternative textbooks eventually became available.

Mansion House meeting
The Movement organised a meeting in the Mansion House, Dublin on 21 September 1966. It was advertised by a poster with a cartoon depicting  the "Gaelic language policy" as a well-fed cow sitting atop the educational system. The meeting was chaired by broadcaster Gay Byrne. About 2000 people turned up, though most of them seemed opposed to the Movement.  Opponents taunted the organisers by waving Union Jacks at them and singing "God save the Queen". As John B. Keane got up to speak one man seized an Irish Tricolour from the table used by the movement, shouting that the flag should not be displayed at such a meeting. A fight involving ten men broke out and calm was only restored when the LFM agreed to four of their opponents speaking at the meeting.

Gardaí were present. At the request of the organisers, Patrick Byrne TD had asked the Garda Commissioner to ensure law and order prevailed.

Irish language writer Máirtín Ó Cadhain and Mick Ryan, the IRA O/C of Dublin were involved in the disruption of the meeting.

See also
Language revival

Archives
The archives of the Language Freedom Movement are held at the Library of the National University of Ireland, Galway. See catalogue.

References

External links 
 Clip of RTE 7 Days report from 1967 (Windows Media Player). News report on the Language Freedom Movement public meeting at the Mansion House.
 James Hardiman Library Archives - G44 - Language Freedom Movement - archive of materials from 1966 to 1974 held at NUI Galway
1966 establishments in Ireland
History of the Republic of Ireland
Politics of the Republic of Ireland
Political organisations based in Ireland
Organizations established in 1966